Christine M. Day (born 1962) is a Canadian retail executive. She has been the CEO of the Vancouver-based food company Luvo Inc. since January 2014.  From 2008 through December 2013, she was the CEO of the Canadian clothing company Lululemon Athletica. Prior to taking her post at Lululemon she worked for Starbucks' Asia-Pacific division.

Early life and education
Day was born in Northern Ireland. When her father's career as a professional soccer player was ended by a knee injury, the family emigrated to Canada and settled in British Columbia where he worked as an engineer.  In 1984, she received her undergraduate degree from Central Washington University.

Career
After graduating from college, Day worked for private-equity corporation, Integrated Resources, where she learned about investment. Later, Day worked for a financial services firm. One of its clients was Howard Schultz, who owned the Il Giornale coffee outlet and was looking to expand the company by purchasing Starbucks. In 1986, Day began working for Schultz's company and remained with Starbucks for the next 20 years. In 2002, she attended Harvard Business School's six-week advanced management program. In 2003, she became the head of Starbucks' Asia-Pacific division.

Day became CEO of Lululemon Athletica in January 2008. In 2011, she became the first woman to be named "CEO of the Year" by The Globe and Mail and was named "Marketer of the Year" by the Canadian Marketing Association.  In June 2013, Day announced that she would be resigning as CEO of the company. Laurent Potdevin was later named as the company's new CEO.

Day became the new CEO of Luvo Inc., a startup food and catering company that sells healthy frozen foods. It is based in Vancouver with most of its operations in Atlanta, Georgia. She owns 15% of Luvo and is the company's second largest shareholder, after its founder Steve Sidwell. Day has said that she was drawn to Luvo's company mission, and believed it had an opportunity for marketplace disruption.

Day is currently a partner in the Vancouver-based venture capital firm Campfire Capital.

Personal life

Day is married with two sons and a daughter. Her husband Pat held a senior post at Boeing for twenty years but retired from the company after the birth of their youngest child.

References

Further reading

The following have further material on Day's management style:
Hill, Charles; Jones, Gareth; Schilling, Melissa (2014). "External Analysis The Identification of Opportunities and Threats: Lululemon". Strategic Management: Theory & Cases: An Integrated Approach, pp. 175–178. Cengage Learning. 
Taylor, Timothy (24 November 2011). "CEO of the Year: Christine Day of Lululemon". The Globe and Mail
Williamson, R. Douglas (2013). "41. Acting When Pivot Points Emerge: Lululemon Athletica". Straight Talk on Leadership: Solving Canada's Business Crisis. John Wiley & Sons. 

1962 births
Living people
Northern Ireland emigrants to Canada
Canadian corporate directors
Canadian retail chief executives
Canadian women business executives
Central Washington University alumni
Lululemon Athletica
Businesspeople from Northern Ireland
Starbucks people
Women corporate directors
Businesspeople from British Columbia